Berberis angustifolia is a shrub in the family Berberidaceae, first described as a species in 1840.

References

angustifolia
Endemic flora of Mexico
Flora of Hidalgo (state)
Plants described in 1840
Taxa named by George Bentham